Psidium cattleyanum (World Plants : Psidium cattleianum), commonly known as Cattley guava, strawberry guava or cherry guava, is a small tree (2–6 m tall) in the Myrtaceae (myrtle) family. The species is named in honour of English horticulturist William Cattley.  Its genus name Psidium comes from the Latin psidion, or "armlet." The red-fruited variety, P. cattleyanum var. cattleyanum,  is commonly known as purple guava, red cattley guava, red strawberry guava and red cherry guava. The yellow-fruited variety, P. cattleyanum var. littorale is variously known as yellow cattley guava, yellow strawberry guava, yellow cherry guava, lemon guava and in Hawaii as waiawī. Although P. cattleyanum has select economic uses, it is considered the most invasive plant in Hawaii.

Description 
Psidium cattleyanum is a small, highly-branched tree that reaches a maximum height of 13 meters, although most individuals are between 2 and 4 m. P. cattleyanum has smooth, grey to reddish-brown bark, with oval to elliptical leaves that grow to 4.5 cm in length. It bears fruit when the plants are between 3 and 6 years old. This fruit has thin skin that ranges from yellow to a dark red or purple, is ovular in shape, and grows to around 4 cm in length. Its flowers grow either individually or in clusters of three, and each flower has five petals.

P. cattleyanum reproduces through setting seed and through cloning. Clonally produced suckers tend to have a greater leaf area. Though native to Brazil, it is now distributed throughout many tropical regions. It was introduced in Hawaii as early as 1825 to create an agricultural market for its fruits, but it has yet to be a commercially viable product. It is now highly prevalent in tropical rain forest ecosystems due mainly to accidental transportation and its invasive plant properties.

P. cattleyanum has modest economic impacts in Hawaii due to its edible fruits and beads that are made by tying individual fruits together. However, products made from P. cattleyanum are not commercially available because of a lack of market and the heavy presence of fruit flies. This renders the fruits inedible soon after they are picked. It’s seeds have many health benefits, including antioxidant, anti-inflammatory, and antimicrobial properties in addition to a high amount of Vitamin C.

Ecology 
P. cattleyanum occurs primarily in mesic tropical rainforest environments at an elevation of up to 1300m, but is found primarily below 800m. Its native range is restricted to the Amazonian Basin in Brazil, but it has established in many other tropical areas of similar characteristics.

P. cattleyanum does not dominate plant communities in its native range. But, it is invasive due to its robust tolerance to many different environments. P. cattleyanum is prevalent in both undisturbed and highly disturbed roadside habitats in its invasive range. Its invasive quality may be explained by a high amount of genetic variation, as variants of different fruit colors cluster at different elevations. Additionally, P. cattleyanum is both very shade-tolerant and able to withstand soils with a moderate to high pH level. It is also capable of withstanding heavy leaf litter and responding to bending or breaking of its branches by generating vigorous shoots.

P. cattleyanum is often associated with invasive feral pigs The two species are often found near each other, most likely because feral pigs aid in the spread of P. cattleyanum. The pigs disturb habitats by digging in the soil, making it easier for P. cattleyanum seeds to reach the soil. Additionally, feral pigs may ingest the fruits, whose seeds reach the soil in the scat of the feral pigs.

Preliminary research suggests that P. cattleyanum is allelopathic, as its roots have been found to inhibit the growth of at least two other plant species when soil pH was not a factor.

Invasive species

Native to Brazil where it is known as araçá (ara-SAH) and adjacent tropical South America, it is closely related to common guava (P. guajava), and like that species is a widespread, highly invasive species in tropical areas throughout the Indian and Pacific Oceans. It also occupies humid subtropical forests such as in the Azores, though it is not as invasive there. It tends to form dense, monotypic stands which prevent regrowth of native species, and is very difficult to eradicate; it also provides refuge for fruit flies which cause extensive agricultural damage.  It is able to propagate quickly due to the spread of its seed, which occurs as its seeds fall and as birds and feral pigs transport fruits, as well as through its root sprouts.

As an invasive species, P. cattleyanum is sometimes erroneously called Chinese guava. It was introduced to many of the areas it now invades due to human usage as a crop for its edible fruit. 

Cattley guava is sporadically naturalised in coastal areas of Queensland and northern New South Wales. It is also naturalised on Lord Howe Island, Norfolk Island and Christmas Island (Navie 2004; Queensland Herbarium 2008). The yellow variety bears even more heavily than the red and generally has larger fruit.

P. cattleyanum grows effectively in undisturbed areas, complicating restoration efforts in sensitive habitats. Its ubiquity in damaged ecosystems further muddles management due to its high dispersal from these less-sensitive habitats to more fragile habitats.

P. cattleyanum acts as an invasive by creating dense thickets that crowd out sunlight, limiting the potential for other plant species to coexist. Its ability to thrive in a variety of different habitats under many different ecological conditions threatens native flora of many different habitat types. Additionally, its potential allelopathic qualities further complicate the ability of other plant species to coexist.

Guava is also one of the most invasive species on Réunion where it is a threat to the endemic forests.

Control Strategies 

A variety of management strategies have been applied to P. cattleyanum management efforts due to its ubiquity and the various ways it spreads. Despite the great threat that P. cattleyanum poses to many tropical ecosystems, some studies indicate that isolated groups can be totally eradicated after three to four years of proper management applications, such as cutting and burning mature individuals and applying herbicide to stumps. However, continued follow-up management is necessary indefinitely after a period of high-intensity restoration. This management strategy, known as the “special ecological areas,” is one of the strongest ways of controlling plant species over time. It works by focusing wood removal, burning, and other management efforts in the designated efforts.

Feral pigs and non-native birds contribute to the spread of P. cattleyanum via seed dispersal. Thus, some control efforts involve removal and control of invasive fauna. However, results from such efforts are often unsuccessful due to the lack of dependence upon the animals for dispersal, as germination occurs under a wide variety of conditions.

Another management technique is the introduction of insects that act as parasites on the invasive plants. This biological control approach is used because certain insects cause damage to P. cattleyanum in a way that either prevents the tree from reproducing or kills them outright. Most of the proposed insects infect the tree with bud or leaf galls, effectively preventing fruit growth or photosynthesis. For example, Diasineura gigantea caused bud galls that inhibited shoot growth. The Brazilian Scale is a potential biological control agent used  in Florida, and Hawaii. However, some insects cannot be used due to the potential for certain species to attack more than P. cattleyanum. Once such species, the sawfly (Haplostegus epimelas), attacked commercially produced guava plants in addition to invasive P. cattleyanum.

Uses
The whole fruit can be eaten as both the thin skin and juicy interior are soft and tasty. It can also be used to make jam. The skin is often removed for a sweeter flavour. The seeds are small and white in colour. Its leaves may be brewed for tea. The wood of the tree is hard, compact, durable, and resistant, and is used for lathe work, tool handles, charcoal, and firewood. The plant is indispensable for mixed planting in reforestation of reclaimed and protected areas in Brazil.

Gallery

References

The Complete Book of Fruit Growing in Australia, Louis Glowinski,

External links
 Psidium cattleianum (cattley guava) information from the HEAR project

 Photo of ripening yellow cattley guavas. Retrieved 2007-NOV-25.

cattleyanum
Flora of Brazil
Ornamental trees
Garden plants of South America
Edible fruits

ja:キバンジロウ